The Chistehorn is a mountain of the Bernese Alps, overlooking Hohtenn in the canton of Valais. It lies south of the Wannihorn.

References

External links
 Chistehorn on Hikr

Mountains of the Alps
Mountains of Switzerland
Mountains of Valais
Bernese Alps
Two-thousanders of Switzerland